Kocho (Ge'ez: ቆጮ, ḳōč̣ō) is a bread-like fermented food made from chopped and grated ensete pulp. The pseudo-stem of the ensete plant contains a pith that is collected, pulped, and mixed with yeast before being fermented for three months to two years. It is used as a staple in Ethiopian cuisine in place of or alongside injera. In 1975 more than one-sixth of Ethiopians depended completely or partially on kocho for a substantial part of their food. It is eaten with foods such as kitfo, gomen (cooked greens), and ayibe (cheese).

References

Ethiopian cuisine